Pterycombus brama is a species of fish belonging to the family Bramidae.

Its native range is Atlantic Ocean.

References

Bramidae